Game of Desire may refer to

 "Mata Hari" (Samira Efendi song)
 A 2012 exhibition by Shirin Neshat
 , a 2019 Chinese film in which Song Jia has a cameo appearance
 , a 2013 South Korean film